The Occaneechi Band of the Saponi Nation is a state-recognized tribe in North Carolina. 

They first formed as the Eno Occaneechi Indian Association in 1984 but changed their name in 1994. They claim descent from the historic Occaneechi, Saponi, and other Eastern Siouan language-speaking Indians who occupied the Piedmont of North Carolina and Virginia. 

The tribe maintains an office in Mebane, where it carries out programs to benefit more than 2,000 members. John "Blackfeather" Jeffries (d. 2023) of Hillsborough, North Carolina, served as chairperson for many years.

Historical tribes 
Limited documentation exists linking members of the tribe to the historical Occaneechi and Saponi tribes. After warfare in the Southeast in the 18th century, most of the remaining Saponi tribe members went north. In 1740, Saponi migrated to Shamokin in Pennsylvania for protection with the Haudenosaunee.  In 1711 the majority of Saponi migrated with the Cayuga to near Ithaca, New York, while some remained in Pennsylvania until 1778. After the American Revolution, they relocated with the Iroquois in Canada, as they had been allies of the British.

After the war and migration, the Saponi disappeared from the historical record in the Southeast, in part because of racial discrimination that often included them in records only as free people of color, when the states and federal government had no category in censuses for American Indian. This was especially true in the late 19th and early 20th century, after white Democrats regained control of state legislatures across the South and imposed a binary system of racial segregation.

Remnant Saponi who stayed in North Carolina were mostly acculturated. The community was located at the old "Little Texas" community of Pleasant Grove Township, where the tribe owns  of land. In the 20th century, the tribe worked to revive its cultural traditions.

Nonprofit organization 
In 1996, the Occaneechi Band of the Saponi Nation formed a 501(c)(3) nonprofit organization, and Vickie Jeffries serves as the organization's principal officer. Its mission is "to bring awareness and recognition of the Occaneechi Indians."

State-recognition 
The state of North Carolina formalized its recognition process for Native American tribes and created the North Carolina Commission of Indian Affairs (NCCIA) in 1971. In January 1990, as the Eno Occaneechi Indian Association, the Occaneechi Band petitioned the NCCIA for state recognition but in 1995, the NCCIA's recognition committee denied recognition to the organization on lack of evidence of its connection to the historical tribes it claimed. The committee's denial was based on the "petitioner's failure to meet the required five of eight criteria necessary for such recognition and their failure to establish heritage to an Indian tribe indigenous to North Carolina for at least the last 200 years." 

In 1996, Occaneechi Band "filed a petition for contested case hearing with the Office of Administrative Hearings" which precipitated a year and a half of mediation. An administrative law judge recommended the NCCIA committee grant recognition to the Occaneechi Band. The NCCIA recognition committee made its Final Agency Decision against state recognition in June 1999. In August 1999, the Occaneechi Band petitioned the Orange County Superior Court, which ruled in favor of the NCCIA.

In August 2001, Judge Loretta Copeland Biggs ruled in Occaneechi Band of the Saponi Nation v. North Carolina Commission of Indian Affairs that the commission had not rendered its Final Agency Decision within the allotted time frame, so the administrative law judge's recommendation held, and the Occaneechi Band was state recognized.

Federal recognition 
The Occaneechi Band of Saponi Nation, represented by Lawrence Dunmore III, sent a letter of intent to petition for U.S. federal recognition as a Native American tribe in 1995, and the Eno-Occaneechi Tribe of Indians sent a letter in 1997; however, neither submitted complete petitions to the Bureau of Indian Affairs.

Activities
The band purchased 24-acres of farmland, where its Homeland Preservation Project constructed a replica of Occaneechi Town, an 1880s-style farm, a 1930-style farm, a dance ground, and pavilion. They rededicated the land on April 2022. There they host their annual powwow on the second weekend in June on Dailey Store Road, ten miles (16 km) north of Mebane.

See also
 Haliwa-Saponi Indian Tribe
 Sappony

Notes

References

External links
 Occaneechi Band of the Saponi Nation, official website
 North Carolina Commission of Indian Affairs

1984 establishments in North Carolina
Cultural organizations based in North Carolina
Native American tribes in North Carolina
Native American history of North Carolina
Non-profit organizations based in North Carolina
State-recognized tribes in the United States